Petroleum Authority of Thailand Rayong Football Club, also referred to as simply PTT Rayong, was a Thai professional football club based in Rayong Province. They competed in Thai League 1 until 2019 after promotion as runner-up in 2007 from the Thailand Division 2 League. PTT FC is a company-sponsored sports club owned by the PTT Public Company Limited.

History
From the settlement of PTT Public Company Limited in Map Ta Phut subdistrict and Rayong Provincial Administrative Organization have the same goal in sports activities in line with the corporate social responsibility approach of PTT Group which foresees that sports can strengthen the community. Meanwhile, PTT Public Company Limited had a football team founded in 1983 active in many competitions, both domestic and foreign. PTT Public Company Limited and Rayong Provincial Administrative Organization set up a football team to encourage the people of Rayong to see the benefits of football and improve the reputation of Rayong Province.

In 2012 the club built their own football stadium – PTT Stadium in Rayong, Thailand.

In 2019 PTT Public Company Limited decided to dissolve the team after talking with the executive board stated that the PTT group did not have enough expertise in running a professional football club. The club president, Chansilp Treinuchakorn, cited the low number of supporters as the reason for folding the club. Chansilp Treinuchakorn disclosed that the PTT Group aspired to develop a football club that truly represents the people residing in the Rayong province and one that deserves their support. From now on, the PTT group will focus on its youth football academy, hoping to assemble a side that fulfills the potential of local talents and wins the support of the local residents in the province.

Crest history

Stadium and locations

Season by season domestic record

P = Played
W = Games won
D = Games drawn
L = Games lost
F = Goals for
A = Goals against
Pts = Points
Pos = Final position
N/A = No answer

TPL = Thai Premier League

QR1 = First Qualifying Round
QR2 = Second Qualifying Round
QR3 = Third Qualifying Round
QR4 = Fourth Qualifying Round
RInt = Intermediate Round
R1 = Round 1
R2 = Round 2
R3 = Round 3

R4 = Round 4
R5 = Round 5
R6 = Round 6
GR = Group stage
QF = Quarter-finals
SF = Semi-finals
RU = Runners-up
S = Shared
W = Winners

Achievements

Domestic competitions
Thai League 2
Winner: 2018
Thailand Division 2 League
 Runner-up (1): 2007

See also
 PTT Public Company Limited

References

External links
 

Association football clubs established in 1998
Football clubs in Thailand
Rayong province
1998 establishments in Thailand
Association football clubs disestablished in 2019